Feardana Ua Cárthaigh (died 1131), Chief Poet of Connacht.

Overview

The Annals of the Four Masters state, sub anno 1131, that "Feardana Ua Carthaigh, chief poet of Connaught", was killed at the battle of Loch Semhdighdhe in Mide.

The Ua Cárthaigh (anglicised Carthy) family were located in Ui Maine, though apparently not members of the dynasty.

See also

 Michael Carty (1916–1975), Irish politician.

References

 http://www.ucc.ie/celt/published/T100005B/
 http://www.irishtimes.com/ancestor/surname/index.cfm?fuseaction=Go.&UserID=

People from County Galway
People from County Roscommon
12th-century Irish poets
Irish-language poets
1131 deaths
Year of birth unknown
Irish male poets
12th-century Irish writers